This list shows past and current rail transport locomotive classes used in South Africa. It includes locomotives from all original operators:
Cape Government Railways (CGR)
Cape Town Railway and Dock (CTR&D)
Central South African Railways (CSAR)
Deutsch-Südwest-Afrika (DSWA)
Imperial Military Railways (IMR)
Kowie Railway
Metropolitan & Suburban Railway (M&S)
Namaqualand Railway (CCC & NCC)
Natal Government Railways (NGR)
Natal Railway Company (NRC)
Nederlandsche-Zuid-Afrikaansche Spoorweg-Maatschappij (NZASM)
New Cape Central Railway (NCCR)
Oranje-Vrijstaat Gouwerment-Spoorwegen (OVGS)
Passenger Rail Agency of South Africa (PRASA)
Pretoria-Pietersburg Railway (PPR)
South African Railways (SAR)
Spoornet
Transnet Freight Rail (TFR)
Zululand Railway Company

Steam locomotives

Electric locomotives

Gas-electric, Diesel-electric, Diesel-hydraulic & Electro-diesel locomotives

See also
Rail transport and locomotives in South Africa

 South African locomotive history
 Rail transport in South Africa
 South African locomotive numbering and classification

Preservation

 Outeniqua Transport Museum
 Sandstone Estates
 Umgeni Steam Railway
 Rovos Rail

Locomotives and rolling stock

 List of locomotive builders
 List of railway vehicles

Locomotive classes
SouthAfrica